Liza 'Bird' Burgess (born 24 March 1964) is a former Welsh women's rugby union player who was a member of the 2018 World Rugby Hall of Fame class of inductees. Nicknamed Bird, her career spanned three decades, which included participating in the Wales Women's first-ever international in 1987, captaining Wales 62 times, playing in four World Cups, and coaching in two World Cups.

Rugby
Burgess' rugby career started at Loughborough University in 1983 (coached by Jim Greenwood) and continued at the Wasps after graduating. In 1986, Buress made her international debut playing for Great Britain against the Netherlands and France.  She would then help form the Saracens, playing with the club for a decade and leading the side to the first treble recorded in the women’s domestic game (League and Cup in 15s and the National Sevens).

After retiring from playing, Burgess has since coached the Wales women's national rugby union team forwards (and the under-20s national team) and is an assistant at the Gloucester Hartpury in the Tyrrells Premier 15s. Burgess was also the assistant coach for the inaugural Barbarian women's team in 2017. While teaching in London, she encouraged Maggie Alphonsi to play rugby.

Burgess was the first woman to join the Welsh Rugby Union national council as a member in September 2019. Also in 2019, she was on the first panel to determine the World Rugby women's-15s player-of-the-year award with Melodie Robinson, Danielle Waterman, Will Greenwood, Lynne Cantwell, Fiona Coghlan, Gaëlle Mignot, Jillion Potter, Stephen Jones, and Karl Te Nana.

References

External links
Wales Rugby Union biography

Living people
1964 births
World Rugby Hall of Fame inductees
Welsh female rugby union players
Wales international rugby union players
Loughborough Students RUFC players
Alumni of Loughborough University